A list of films produced in Brazil in 1931:

See also
 1931 in Brazil

External links
Brazilian films of 1931 at the Internet Movie Database

Brazil
1931
Films